Nallachius americanus is a species of pleasing lacewing in the family Dilaridae. It is found in the Caribbean Sea, North America, and South America.

References

Further reading

External links

 

Hemerobiiformia
Articles created by Qbugbot
Insects described in 1881